Phymorhynchus moskalevi is a species of sea snail, a marine gastropod mollusk in the family Raphitomidae.

This species has been described from hydrothermal vents in 1995.

Description
The length of the shell attains 39 mm.

Distribution
This species occurs on the Mid-Atlantic Ridge.

References

 Sysoev, A.V. & Kantor, Yu.I. (1995) Two new species of Phymorhynchus (Gastropoda, Conoidea, Conidae) from the hydrothermal vents. Ruthenica, 5, 17–26.

External links
 

moskalevi
Gastropods described in 1995